Tine Mena (born 17 September 1986) is an Indian mountaineer, who on 9 May 2011 became the first woman from Northeast India & Arunachalee woman to reach the summit of Mount Everest.

Early life
Tine was born in a remote village of Echali, which is located 178 km from the district headquarter Roing. Her childhood was spent in the laps of mountains and nature. She used to work as a porter for the Indian Army when she was just 17 years old. Her total expenditure during the expedition in 2011 was near about Rs. 20 lakhs.

References

See also
Indian summiters of Mount Everest - Year wise
List of Mount Everest summiters by number of times to the summit
List of Mount Everest records of India
List of Mount Everest records

1986 births
Living people
Indian female mountain climbers
Indian mountain climbers
People from Lower Dibang Valley district
Indian summiters of Mount Everest
21st-century Indian women
21st-century Indian people

Arunachal Pradesh
Mountain climbers from Arunachal Pradesh